Maienfeld railway station is a railway station in the municipality of Maienfeld, in the Swiss canton of Grisons. It is an intermediate stop on the Chur–Rorschach line.

Services 
Maienfeld is served by the S12 of the St. Gallen S-Bahn:

 : half-hourly service between Sargans and Chur.

References

External links 
 
 

Railway stations in Graubünden
Swiss Federal Railways stations
Maienfeld